Euperilampus is a genus of chalcid wasps in the family Perilampidae. There are about 18 described species in Euperilampus.

Species
These 18 species belong to the genus Euperilampus:

 Euperilampus ameca Darling, 1983 c g
 Euperilampus aureicornis Darling, 1983 c g
 Euperilampus brasiliensis (Ashmead, 1904) c g
 Euperilampus enigma Darling, 1983 c g
 Euperilampus gloriosus (Walker, 1862) c g
 Euperilampus hymenopterae (Risbec, 1952) c g
 Euperilampus iodes Darling, 1983 c g
 Euperilampus krombeini Burks, 1969 c g
 Euperilampus lepreos (Walker, 1846) c g
 Euperilampus luteicrus Darling, 1983 c g
 Euperilampus magnus Darling, 1983 c g
 Euperilampus mediterraneus Boucek, 1972 c g
 Euperilampus scutellatus (Girault, 1915) c g
 Euperilampus sinensis Boucek, 1978 c g
 Euperilampus solox Darling, 1983 c g
 Euperilampus spina Boucek, 1978 c g
 Euperilampus tanyglossa Darling, 1983 c g
 Euperilampus triangularis (Say, 1829) c g b

Data sources: i = ITIS, c = Catalogue of Life, g = GBIF, b = Bugguide.net

References

Further reading

External links

 

Parasitic wasps
Chalcidoidea